January 28 - Eastern Orthodox liturgical calendar - January 30

All fixed commemorations below are observed on February 11 by Eastern Orthodox Churches on the Old Calendar.

For January 29th, Orthodox Churches on the Old Calendar commemorate the Saints listed on January 16.

Saints
 Martyr Chryse (ca. 41-54)
 Martyrs Sarbelus (Thathuil) and his sister Bebaia, of Edessa (110)
 Saint Barsimaeus the Confessor, Hieromartyr Bishop of Edessa (114)
 The Holy Seven Martyrs of Samosata (297):
 Martyrs Romanus, James, Philotheus, Hyperechius, Abibus, Julian, and Paregorius, at Samosata.
 Hieromartyrs Silvanus, Bishop of Emesa, Luke the Deacon, and Mocius the Reader (312)
 Venerable Aphrahates the Persian, Hermit of Antioch (370)
 Venerable Ascepsimus, monk.
 Saint Ashot Kuropalates of Tao-Klarjeti, Georgia (829)  (see also: January 27)

Pre-Schism Western saints
 Saint Caesarius, a deacon in Angoulême in France under its first bishop St Ausonius (1st century)
 Hieromartyr Constantius of Perugia, first Bishop of Perugia, and Companions (170) 
 Martyr Sabinian of Troyes (275)
 Martyrs Papias and Maurus, soldiers martyred in Rome under Maximian (ca. 303)
 Saint Valerius, second Bishop of Trier in Germany (ca. 320)
 Saint Blath (Flora), a cook at St Brigid's convent in Kildare where she was honoured as a holy woman (523)
 Saint Gildas the Wise, Abbot, of Rhuys, Brittany (ca. 570)
 Saint Severus (Sulpitius I of Bourges, Sulpicius Severus), Bishop of Bourges (591)
 Saint Dallán Forgaill (of Cluain Dallain), a relative of St Aidan of Ferns, born in Connaught, martyred at Inis-coel by pirates (598)
 Saint Aquilinus of Mediolanum (Milan), martyred by the Arians (650)
 Saint Voloc, a bishop from Ireland who worked in Scotland (ca. 724)

Post-Schism Orthodox saints
 Venerable Ignatios the Sinaite, of Rethymno, Crete. 
 Venerable Laurence, recluse of the Kiev Caves and Bishop of Turov (1194)
 Saint Ignatius, Bishop of Smolensk (1210)
 Saint Andrei Rublev, iconographer, of the Spaso-Andronikov Monastery (Moscow) (1430)
 Saints Gerasimus (1441), Pitirim (1455), and Jonah (1470), Bishops of Perm.
 New Martyr Demetrius of Chios, at Constantinople (1802)

New martyrs and confessors
 New Hieromartyrs John Granitov and Leontius Klimenko, Priests; Constantine Zverev, Deacon; and with them 5 Martyrs (1920)

Other commemorations
 Translation of the relics (5th century) of Hieromartyr Ignatius the God-bearer, Bishop of Antioch (107)
 Synaxis of All Saints of Yekaterinburg.

Icon gallery

Notes

References

Sources
 January 29 / February 11. Orthodox Calendar (PRAVOSLAVIE.RU).
 February 11 / January 29. HOLY TRINITY RUSSIAN ORTHODOX CHURCH (A parish of the Patriarchate of Moscow).
 January 29. OCA - The Lives of the Saints.
 The Autonomous Orthodox Metropolia of Western Europe and the Americas (ROCOR). St. Hilarion Calendar of Saints for the year of our Lord 2004. St. Hilarion Press (Austin, TX). p. 11.
 January 29. Latin Saints of the Orthodox Patriarchate of Rome.
 The Roman Martyrology. Transl. by the Archbishop of Baltimore. Last Edition, According to the Copy Printed at Rome in 1914. Revised Edition, with the Imprimatur of His Eminence Cardinal Gibbons. Baltimore: John Murphy Company, 1916. pp. 29–30.
 Rev. Richard Stanton. A Menology of England and Wales, or, Brief Memorials of the Ancient British and English Saints Arranged According to the Calendar, Together with the Martyrs of the 16th and 17th Centuries. London: Burns & Oates, 1892. pp. 39–40.
Greek Sources
 Great Synaxaristes:  29 ΙΑΝΟΥΑΡΙΟΥ. ΜΕΓΑΣ ΣΥΝΑΞΑΡΙΣΤΗΣ.
  Συναξαριστής. 29 Ιανουαρίου. ECCLESIA.GR. (H ΕΚΚΛΗΣΙΑ ΤΗΣ ΕΛΛΑΔΟΣ). 
Russian Sources
  11 февраля (29 января). Православная Энциклопедия под редакцией Патриарха Московского и всея Руси Кирилла (электронная версия). (Orthodox Encyclopedia - Pravenc.ru).
  29 января (ст.ст.) 11 февраля 2013 (нов. ст.). Русская Православная Церковь Отдел внешних церковных связей. (DECR).

January in the Eastern Orthodox calendar